Jonathan Thompson may refer to:

Jonathan Thompson (collector) (1773–1846), 19th-century New York politician
Jonathan M. Thompson (born 1971), game designer
Jon Thompson (civil servant) (born 1964), British civil servant

See also
John Thompson (disambiguation)
Jon Thompson (disambiguation)
Jon Thomson (born 1969), British visual artist